SMAT may refer to:

Small molecule anti-genomic therapeutics
Santa Maria Area Transit
Science Math Aptitude Test
 The School of Mission Aviation Technology, located at Ionia County Airport in Michigan